Mazzalve Parish is an administrative unit of Aizkraukle Municipality in the Selonia region of Latvia.

Towns, villages and settlements of Mazzalve Parish 
Ērberģe
Lielmēmele

Parishes of Latvia
Aizkraukle Municipality
Selonia